St Michael's Catholic Academy (formerly St Michael's Roman Catholic School) is a coeducational Roman Catholic secondary school with academy status, located in Billingham, the Borough of Stockton-on-Tees, England. The school converted to academy status on 2 September 2013 under the sponsorship of Bishop Hogarth Catholic Educational Trust. The Headteacher of the school is Clare Humble.

Funded by the Government's Building Schools for the Future investment scheme, St. Michael's was to be relocated to a site adjacent to Billingham Campus School, in the second wave of funding from the programme. However, following the scrapping of the program in 2010, the relocation was cancelled. The new school building was opened in 2016, the old school buildings have since been demolished.

References

External links
St. Michael’s School Website

Secondary schools in the Borough of Stockton-on-Tees
Catholic secondary schools in the Diocese of Hexham and Newcastle
Educational institutions established in 1932
1932 establishments in England
Academies in the Borough of Stockton-on-Tees
Billingham